Diyan Donchev (born 8 January 1974 in Varna) is a former Bulgarian footballer. As a player, he was a defender and midfielder from 1992 to 2012.

He played for Spartak Varna and Lokomotiv Sofia, having also had spells with Greek side AEK Athens, Cherno More, Sportist Svoge and Dorostol Silistra. He was capped once for the Bulgarian team in 1999.

International career
In March 1999 the Bulgarian national coach Dimitar Dimitrov called Donchev in Bulgaria national football team for friendly match against Ukraine. Diyan made his debut, but the result of the match was a 0:1 loss for Bulgaria.

External links 

1974 births
Living people
Bulgarian footballers
Bulgaria international footballers
First Professional Football League (Bulgaria) players
Super League Greece players
PFC Spartak Varna players
AEK Athens F.C. players
FC Lokomotiv 1929 Sofia players
PFC Cherno More Varna players
FC Sportist Svoge players
Bulgarian expatriate footballers
Expatriate footballers in Greece

Association football defenders
Sportspeople from Varna, Bulgaria